Ivan Lendl defeated Miloslav Mečíř in the final, 6–2, 6–2, 6–2 to win the men's singles tennis title at the 1989 Australian Open.

Mats Wilander was the defending champion, but lost in the second round to Ramesh Krishnan.

This was the first Australian Open in which future world No. 1 Pete Sampras competed in the main draw.

Seeds
The seeded players are listed below. Ivan Lendl is the champion; others show the round in which they were eliminated.

  Mats Wilander (second round)
  Ivan Lendl (champion)
  Boris Becker (fourth round)
  Stefan Edberg (quarterfinals, withdrew)
  Jakob Hlasek (first round)
  Henri Leconte (first round)
  John McEnroe (quarterfinals)
  Yannick Noah (first round)
  Miloslav Mečíř (final)
  Aaron Krickstein (fourth round)
  Thomas Muster (semifinals)
  Mikael Pernfors (third round)
  Pat Cash (fourth round)
  Jonas Svensson (quarterfinals)
  John Fitzgerald (second round)
  Amos Mansdorf (fourth round)

Qualifying

Draw

Key
 Q = Qualifier
 WC = Wild card
 LL = Lucky loser
 r = Retired

Finals

Section 1

Section 2

Section 3

Section 4

Section 5

Section 6

Section 7

Section 8

External links
 Association of Tennis Professionals (ATP) – 1989 Australian Open Men's Singles draw
 1989 Australian Open – Men's draws and results at the International Tennis Federation

Mens singles
Australian Open (tennis) by year – Men's singles